Walter Kimberley (28 September 1884 – 22 April 1917) was an English professional footballer who played in the Football League for Aston Villa as a left back and right half.

Personal life 
As of 1901 and 1904, Kimberley worked as an engraver and a packer respectively. While playing for Coventry City, Kimberley worked at the Coventry Ordnance Works. An army reservist since 1904, Kimberley rejoined the Coldstream Guards in August 1914, after Britain's entry into the First World War and was appointed lance corporal. The following month, he was captured by the Germans at Maubeuge during the First Battle of the Marne and spent two years as a prisoner of war in camps at Döberitz, Dyrotz and Cottbus. Beginning with a six-month stay in hospital with laryngitis and bronchitis, Kimberley's health declined during his internment and he was repatriated to Britain in August 1916 with pulmonary tuberculosis. He was immediately discharged from the army and fell into severe ill heath, permanently losing his voice and dying at home in Aston on 22 April 1917. Kimberley was buried in Witton Cemetery, Birmingham. He was married and had two children, one of whom died in infancy.

Career statistics

References

1884 births
1917 deaths
Footballers from Birmingham, West Midlands
English footballers
English Football League players
Association football fullbacks
British Army personnel of World War I
Coldstream Guards soldiers
World War I prisoners of war held by Germany
Aston Villa F.C. players
Coventry City F.C. players
Walsall F.C. players
Southern Football League players
Association football midfielders
Tuberculosis deaths in England
20th-century deaths from tuberculosis
British World War I prisoners of war
Military personnel from Birmingham, West Midlands